Rameshwor Phuyal is a member of 2nd Nepalese Constituent Assembly. He won Kathamndu–3 seat in 2013 Nepalese Constituent Assembly election from Communist Party of Nepal (Unified Marxist-Leninist).

References

Year of birth missing (living people)
Communist Party of Nepal (Unified Marxist–Leninist) politicians
Living people
Provincial cabinet ministers of Nepal
Members of the Provincial Assembly of Bagmati Province
Members of the 2nd Nepalese Constituent Assembly